Chislehurst railway station is on the South Eastern Main Line, serving the neighbourhood of Chislehurst in the London Borough of Bromley.

It is in Travelcard Zone 5, and the station and all trains are operated by Southeastern.

History
The station was originally named Chislehurst and Bickley Park when it was first opened on 1 July 1865: the South Eastern Railway had opened part of its cut-off line to Dover on that date. On 2 March 1868 a new station was opened south of the original on completion of the cut-off to Tonbridge. At the beginning of the 20th century the tracks through the station were quadrupled. Beyond Elmstead Woods station (opened in 1904) to the north of Chislehurst lie the Chislehurst Tunnels, a tunnel each on the slow lines  and fast lines .

To the south of the station the Up and Down Chatham Loop lines give access to the Chatham Main Line where the next station is St Mary Cray. There are normally no direct trains between Chislehurst and St Mary Cray, as trains that use the connecting curves usually run non-stop between London Bridge and either Rochester or West Malling.

When engineering work takes place on the South Eastern Main Line, services from London to Ashford International or Hastings call additionally at Chislehurst, using Class 375 units. These services are diverted onto the Chatham Main Line and run via Swanley and Otford.

Chislehurst Caves
The station is very close to Chislehurst Caves, former mines that were used as an air raid shelter during World War II. The close proximity of the station saw thousands of people at one point disembark at the station to enter the shelter.

Connections
London Buses routes 162, 269 and R7 serve the station.

Services 

The typical off-peak service in trains per hour is:
 2 tph to London Cannon Street (all stations except Lewisham)

On Sundays, the station is served by a half-hourly service between Sevenoaks and London Charing Cross via Lewisham.

References

External links 

Railway stations in the London Borough of Bromley
DfT Category D stations
Former South Eastern Railway (UK) stations
Railway stations in Great Britain opened in 1865
Railway stations in Great Britain closed in 1868
Railway stations in Great Britain opened in 1868
Railway stations served by Southeastern
Chislehurst